{{Infobox video game series
|title = Naruto: Ultimate NinjaNaruto: Narutimate Series
|image = 
|developer = CyberConnect2
|publisher = Bandai Namco Entertainment
|creator = 
|composer = Chikayo Fukuda
|genre = Fighting game, Role-playing game
|platforms =  PlayStation 2, PlayStation 3, PlayStation Portable, Xbox 360, Microsoft Windows, PlayStation 4, Xbox One, Nintendo Switch, PlayStation Vita, PlayStation 5, Xbox Series X/S
|first release version = Naruto: Ultimate Ninja
|first release date = October 23, 2003
|latest release version = Naruto X Boruto: Ultimate Ninja Storm Connections
|latest release date = TBA
It was developed by CyberConnect2, and published by Bandai and later Bandai Namco Games. The first game was released in 2003 for the PlayStation 2, and was followed by four more titles for the system, as well as five spinoffs for the PlayStation Portable. A follow-up for the PlayStation 3, entitled Naruto: Ultimate Ninja Storm, was the first to feature three-dimensional battles, and began the long-running Storm sub-series. While starting out as a series exclusive to the PlayStation family of systems, the series has also been present on Xbox and PC platforms since the release of Naruto Shippuden: Ultimate Ninja Storm 2 for the Xbox 360 and Naruto Shippuden: Ultimate Ninja Storm 3 Full Burst for Windows, respectively. Latest releases were also ported to the Nintendo Switch. The Naruto: Ultimate Ninja series sold over 20 million copies worldwide as of December 2019.

Naruto: Ultimate Ninja series

The game was released on October 23, 2003, in Japan, November 17, 2006 in Europe, June 26, 2006 in North America, and November 17, 2006 in Australia.

There are special techniques and jutsus that can be used. Some characters feature the ability to activate special mode by inflicting the special techniques which enhances their status and gives them new abilities. It also features several items, like shuriken and kunai. There are many multi-layered stages from around the Naruto universe, including the Hidden Leaf Village, the Chunin Exam arena, and the Forest of Death. The game also uses support characters such as Naruto's support being Iruka, or Sasuke's support being Kakashi Hatake. The game features an arcade style story mode. Although the game loosely covers the events in the original manga from the Introduction arc up to the Invasion of Konoha arc, the game's twelve stories are meant to depict the events from different characters' perspectives and as the result some of them deviates from the original source (such as Neji being declared the winner in his fight with Naruto). Each stories consist of up to six battles divided by dialogues in a manga style display, one of many homages to its source material.

In the original Japanese version, there were only 12 characters (Gaara, Haku, Hinata Hyūga, Kakashi Hatake, Naruto Uzumaki, Neji Hyūga, Orochimaru, Rock Lee, Sakura Haruno, Sasuke Uchiha, Shikamaru Nara and Zabuza Momochi). However, Namco Bandai has added the ability to separately select both the Curse Mark Sasuke and Nine-Tailed Naruto as bonus characters in the North American and European versions. As these characters were already available in the Japanese version as transformations (of Sasuke and Naruto respectively), both of these characters have lost the ability to transform into their stronger versions during battle. The original Japanese transformation would later serve as the ground up for the transformations in Naruto: Ultimate Ninja 3.

Like some other Naruto games in Japan, this one was available in two covers: one featuring Naruto Uzumaki along with several different characters in the background, and the other with Sasuke Uchiha and several other characters. The game was released on September 30, 2004, in Japan, June 13, 2007 in North America, and October 19, 2007 in Europe.Ultimate Ninja 2 features a similar gameplay experience to Ultimate Ninja, featuring many of the same gameplay elements and geography. The game replaces the arcade-style story mode from the original game with an RPG-esque story mode that loosely covers the events up to episode 96 in the anime as well as a filler arc made up for the game involving a special seal made by Orochimaru. This is the last game to feature support characters until Ultimate Ninja 5 as they were excluded in Ultimate Ninja 3. This time, the support characters are no longer fixed and all characters in the game have the ability to become support characters.

There is a total of 32 characters featured in the game (33 in the Japanese version with the inclusion of Doto Kazahana as a promotion for the movie Naruto the Movie: Ninja Clash in the Land of Snow. The promotion also include two stages from the movie that were not included in the overseas version). All characters have the ability to activate special modes during battle (unlike the original game which restrict the modes to several characters).

This game was released in Japan on December 22, 2005, in North America on March 25, 2008, in Australia on September 12, 2008, and in Europe on September 5, 2008. It was also released in England on September 5, 2008, but is only available in specific Tesco stores. This game features the largest character roster upon release, and third largest roster in the Ultimate Ninja series, with 42 characters, and covers the events up to episode 135 in the anime. The player can use equippable jutsu, a trend that began in the second game, and for the first time, equippable Ultimate Jutsu. When two jutsus of the same strength clash, the game cuts to a jutsu clash, in which the player or players must rapidly press a specific button repeatedly, until either jutsu wins out over the other. In this installment, the player is to both induce temporary transformations (such as Sasuke's Curse Mark, and Rock Lee's Eight Inner Gates) through Ultimate Jutsu, and other, more permanent ones, that last the entire rest of the fight (like Nine-Tailed Naruto or the Second State Curse Mark). The game also heavily expands on the previous game's RPG mode, and is the first in the series to use CGI cutscenes. The player also has the ability to summon other characters through the use of Ultimate Jutsu, such as Gamabunta. However, support characters have been removed and the game restricts the player to use only one Ultimate Jutsu for each battle instead of the usual preset three (though they can be changed before battle).

Additionally, the Japanese version comes with a bonus DVD that includes a special 26-minute anime OVA. It features many characters from the series, both living and dead, making it a non-canon release. The basic plot centers around a Battle Royale tournament, providing players with hints to be used in the RPG mode contained in the game.

Naruto Shippūden: Ultimate Ninja 4

 is the fourth installment of the Ultimate Ninja series, and the first in the Accels. It was released in Japan April 5, 2007, in North America on March 24, 2009, and in Europe on April 30, 2009. The game introduces Naruto Shippūden characters for the first time, featuring 52 playable characters. Other changes include the introduction of fixed ultimate jutsu, which change as health decreases or if the player enters any secondary mode. The graphical style of the game has also been toned down, retaining the anime look. The RPG mode (now called Master Mode) is heavily expanded, now featuring a more action-oriented gameplay and explore the massive world of Naruto (unlike the previous games which had a more sandbox-style gameplay).

The game only covers halfway through the Kazekage Rescue arc in the Shippuden storyline (roughly at episode 15 in the anime), though to make up for the lack of story, a filler arc is made up for the game that takes place before the Shippuden storyline called the "Black Shadow". Hero's History mode from Ultimate Ninja 3 is also retained, now retelling the events of the original series more faithfully and includes completely redone and improved scenes from Naruto Ultimate Ninja 3 as well as redone CGI scenes.

Naruto Shippūden: Ultimate Ninja 5Naruto Shippuden: Ultimate Ninja 5, known in Japan as, is the fifth installment in the Ultimate Ninja series, and was released in Japan on December 20, 2007. It was released in Europe on November 27, 2009, and in Australia on December 3, 2009. The game features 62 characters and continues the Naruto Shippuden storyline, starting over to Kazekage Rescue arc, and going up to the end of Sasuke arc, following the manga covers the events up to episode 53 in the anime (the anime had not finished working on the arc at the time). One of the new gameplay additions is the introduction of assist characters. Assist characters are chosen during character selection, and can be called in during a match to deal extra damage. Certain combinations of characters create unique jutsu in a match; these combinations reflect the associations of those characters in the anime and manga. Many of the character's jutsu from the previous game were updated. There are many updated ultimate jutsu, including the aforementioned assist-specific ones. Summons have been removed from the game. The assist characters cannot be turned off. The game retains the RPG mode from previous game, now allowing the player to control characters other than Naruto (such as Sakura Haruno and Kakashi Hatake). However, the Hero's History mode that retells the events of the original series have been discarded, though the characters itself remain in the game. It was also the last of the Ultimate Ninja Series for the PlayStation 2.

Naruto: Ultimate Ninja Heroes series

Naruto: Ultimate Ninja HeroesNaruto: Ultimate Ninja Heroes, known in Japan as Naruto: Narutimate Portable Zero is a North American and European-exclusive fighting game. It was released in North America on August 28, 2007 and in Europe on September 14, 2007. It is essentially an edited version of Naruto: Narutimate Portable, as well the Japanese dub are not included in this game. which also happens to be a scaled down version of Naruto: Ultimate Ninja 2.

Story Mode, Kabuto, Shizune, The Third Hokage, and two stages were removed in this release, while Naruto & Sasuke's secret techniques were modified to prevent spoilers (as the English dub had not reached the Sasuke Retrieval arc yet). To compensate for these removals, the game now has a 3-on-3 battle system, similar to The King of Fighters; where the first team to defeat all three members of the other team wins.  The game features 20 characters, eight Stages, and several new features, such as a three-on-three fighting system, wireless two-player battles, and "Hidden Team Skills", which grant special abilities to a certain combination of characters.

In this Naruto game, the player chooses four characters and equips them with skills and items. This release is the full non-modified version of Naruto: Ultimate Ninja Heroes, and contains the three characters that were removed: The Third Hokage, Shizune and Kabuto. Both removed stages and the game's Story Mode are now present as well. Additionally, movesets have been updated. Players can also select whether the characters use Japanese or English voices. Jiraiya and Naruto can use Rasengan, Kakashi can use Lightning Blade and Sasuke can use Chidori without the use of a secret technique.

While some characters retain their old techniques, others, such as Neji, have theirs upgraded. The game contains an original storyline involving moving up a haunted castle in the sky to the 100th floor (or 30 subfloors if playing the Hidden Mugenjo Mode.) Each floor has several "blank" rooms where the users place randomly generated scrolls to determine the type of action that will take place in the room. The scrolls include Battle (a player vs. CPU fight) and five mini game scrolls: Tree Climbing (Naruto dashes up a tree and dodges broken branches), Shadow Possession (Simon-style button pressing), Amusement (slot machines), Riddle (answer Naruto trivia) and Clone (the shell game where the player tries to follow the real clone). Non-blank rooms include Treasure Rooms, Healing Rooms and Drama rooms (where the story progresses and cut scenes take place). Other game modes include vs. CPU and ad hoc wireless battle mode where players can fight against a friend using game sharing (only one UMD, but two PSPs).

The game was released in Japan on December 10, 2009 and was released in North America on May 11, 2010. The game features of a roster of more than 50 characters, 48 of which are from the TV series Naruto Shippuden. The game features four-player local multiplayer battles, as well as Sasuke and the members of Team Hebi. It features a story arc designed by CyberConnect2 that is unique to this game, as well as a regular one that follows the Naruto Shippūden storyline and one that follows Sasuke's story. This was the last game released under the Ultimate Ninja Heroes moniker.

Naruto Shippuden: Ultimate Ninja ImpactNaruto Shippūden: Ultimate Ninja Impact ( in Japan), is the sixth Naruto title for the PlayStation Portable. The game's storyline covers the Kazekage Rescue arc up to the Five Kage Summit Arc. The game features boss battles, an all new rush battle system, 1 vs 100 action, ad hoc multiplayer missions, and also features over 50 characters, 26 of which are playable. As a special gift at New York Comic Con 2011, the first 200 people that went to watch Naruto Shippuden the Movie: Bonds along with Naruto Japanese voice actress, Junko Takeuchi, received a free copy of the game. It is the last game in the series to be featured on the PSP, with no further releases due to the release of the PlayStation Vita, the successor system to the PSP.

Naruto: Ultimate Ninja Storm series

Naruto: Ultimate Ninja StormNaruto: Ultimate Ninja Storm, known in Japan as Naruto: Narutimate Storm ( ナルティメットストーム Naruto: Narutimetto Sutōmu?) is a fighting game developed by CyberConnect2 and published by Namco Bandai Games. The game was initially released as an exclusive for the PlayStation 3 in North America, Europe and Australia in November 2008 and in Japan on January 15, 2009. This is the first Naruto fighting game to feature a 3-dimensional fighting system as well as the first to be playable in high-definition.

The game features more characters, stages and story-content than its predecessor, as well as being the first Naruto game to feature online multiplayer. It was released on October 15, 2010, in Europe, October 19, 2010 in North America, and October 21, 2010 in Japan.

Unlike previous Storm games, the game's story mode features separate campaigns for several different characters, with cutscenes being newly-animated OVA's. It was released on February 23, 2012, in Japan, March 13, 2012 in North America, and March 30, 2012 in Europe. Generations is the only game in the Storm series to have not received a PC release.

Mob Battles akin to Naruto Shippūden: Ultimate Ninja Impact were implemented in the story mode, and giant boss-battles from previous Storm games (which were not present in Generations) returned. It was released on March 5, 2013, in the North America, March 8 in Europe and April 18 in Japan.

An re-release, titled Naruto Shippuden: Ultimate Ninja Storm 3 Full Burst was released on October 22, 2013 in the North America, October 24 in Japan and January 31, 2014 in Europe; it features revamped cinematics, all previously-released DLC costumes (with the exceptions of Naruto's Goku costume and Sakura's Hello Kitty costume), a new story chapter and an additional Challenge Mode. It is the first game in the Ultimate Ninja series to be released for PC and Steam.

Naruto Shippūden: Ultimate Ninja Storm Revolution
The game features a restructured fighting system and new ways of forming teams based on character skills, along with various other gameplay tweaks catered to competitive-play. Exclusively for the game, Masashi Kishimoto created the character Mecha-Naruto as well as new designs for the characters in the Akatsuki, whose back-stories covered in the game's "Ninja Escapades" mode (which includes OVAs, akin to Generations). The game also introduces a new mode titled "Ninja World Tournament" where the player can battle against three CPU fighters at the same time. By September 16, 2014, all versions of the game had been released in Japan, Europe and North America.

Naruto Shippūden: Ultimate Ninja Storm 4
It was released on February 4, 2016, in Japan, February 5, 2016 in Europe, and February 9, 2016 in North America.

An expansion, titled Road to Boruto, covers the story of Boruto: Naruto the Movie and was released on February 2, 2017, in Japan and February 3, 2017 in North America and Europe.

A Nintendo Switch port including all DLC was released on April 24, 2020. Coinciding with the release of the Switch port was a DLC pack titled Next Generations, released on PlayStation 4, Xbox One and PC via Steam. The pack includes Kinshiki and Momoshiki Ōtsutsuki as playable characters, along with 11 Boruto-era costumes for characters in the original game.

Naruto Shippuden: Ultimate Ninja Storm Trilogy/Legacy
In April 2017, it was announced that Naruto: Ultimate Ninja Storm, Naruto Shippuden: Ultimate Ninja Storm 2, and Naruto Shippuden: Ultimate Ninja Storm 3: Full Burst would be bundled together and released as a compilation on PlayStation 4, Xbox One, Microsoft Windows, and Nintendo Switch titled Naruto Shippuden: Ultimate Ninja Storm Trilogy. The trilogy includes enhanced graphics and 1080p resolution. It was released on July 27, 2017, in Japan, while a digital-only western released on August 25, 2017 (each of the games can also be bought separately).

A physical western release, titled Naruto Shippuden: Ultimate Ninja Storm Legacy, contains the three games as well as Naruto Shippuden: Ultimate Ninja Storm 4: Road to Boruto, and was made available for PlayStation 4,  Xbox One, and Microsoft Windows on August 25, 2017.

On February 23, 2023, in celebration for the Naruto anime's 20th anniversary, was announced for the Playstation 4, and 5, Nintendo Switch, Xbox One and Series X & S, and PC. It will feature content and story from all previous Ninja Storm games. All 124 characters will return, along with newcomers such as Indra and Asura Ōtsutsuki. 60 FPS support is included with next-gen consoles. It is currently scheduled for a 2023 release.

It's a turn-based action role-playing game, and is currently available on iOS and Android.

Players engage in combat by strategically moving their characters. These characters can level up, known as ‘awakening,’ to beat stronger opponents. After that, they can ‘limit break,’ to achieve an even stronger state. The game features the following playable game modes: Story, Emergency Mission (Missions to get items that improve your ninjas or new ninjas), Trial Missions (get Trial Coins to Limit Break characters), Phantom Castle (fight against Teams of other players and ascend to Floor 100 - prices for each floor), Ninja Road (get an Acquisition Stone to unlock an ability of a character you own by beating all 20 maps in a row), Ninja World Clash (PvP: Build a Team and play against online opponents). The game is free to play, and offers in-app purchase.

Reception

Various Ultimate Ninja games have become Namco Bandai's best-selling games with Ultimate Ninja Storm 2 being its second best-selling game from 2010 behind Tekken 6 with 1.1 million units sold. In January 2012, Namco Bandai announced that they have sold 10 million Naruto games worldwide, including 1.9 million units in Asia, 4.3 million in North America, and 3.8 million in Europe. In celebration CyberConnect2's CEO Hiroshi Matsuyama participated in the 2012 Paris International Marathon while cosplaying as Naruto Uzumaki, thanking fans. By 2016, more than 15 million units were sold. As of 2019, 20 million units have sold. In 2017, the mobile game Ultimate Ninja Blazing grossed  in China.

Critical reception to the games has been positive. G4's X-Play gave Ultimate Ninja a three out of five for a creative comicbook feel and stylish cel-shaded graphics, but complained that the controls are too simple, and that the English voices are "slightly questionable." Both IGN and GameSpot noted the game was both accessible and enjoyable and praised the anime/manga-inspired graphics. Titles for the PlayStation Portable received considerably lower averages in gaming sites. Ultimate Ninja Storm'' was also the only video game to win the Excellent Prize in the Entertainment Division of the 13th annual Japan Media Arts Festival.

References

External links
 

3D fighting games
Video games with cel-shaded animation
CyberConnect2 games
Bandai Namco games
Bandai Namco Entertainment franchises
Ultimate Ninja series
PlayStation 2 games
PlayStation 3 games
PlayStation 4 games
PlayStation Portable games
Shueisha franchises
Xbox 360 games
Xbox One games
Video game franchises
Windows games

it:Naruto: Ultimate Ninja